The 2018–19 season was Ferencvárosi TC's 116th competitive season, 10th consecutive season in the OTP Bank Liga and 119th year in existence as a football club.

Players

First team squad

Transfers

Summer

In:

Out:

Source:

Winter

In:

Out:

Source:

Statistics

Appearances and goals
Last updated on 19 May 2019.

|-
|colspan="14"|Out to loan:

|-
|colspan="14"|Players no longer at the club:

|}

Top scorers
Includes all competitive matches. The list is sorted by shirt number when total goals are equal.
Last updated on 19 May 2019

Disciplinary record
Includes all competitive matches. Players with 1 card or more included only.

Last updated on 19 May 2019

Overall
{|class="wikitable"
|-
|Games played || 42 (33 OTP Bank Liga, 2 Europa League and 7 Hungarian Cup)
|-
|Games won || 27 (23 OTP Bank Liga, 0 Europa League and 4 Hungarian Cup)
|-
|Games drawn || 7 (5 OTP Bank Liga, 1 Europa League and 1 Hungarian Cup)
|-
|Games lost || 8 (5 OTP Bank Liga, 1 Europa League and 2 Hungarian Cup)
|-
|Goals scored || 87
|-
|Goals conceded || 34
|-
|Goal difference || +53
|-
|Yellow cards || 83
|-
|Red cards || 3
|-
|rowspan="1"|Worst discipline ||  Marcel Heister (10 , 1 )
|-
|rowspan="1"|Best result || 7–0 (H) v Diósgyőr - (Nemzeti Bajnokság I) - 02-03-2019
|-
|rowspan="1"|Worst result || 0–2 (A) v MOL Vidi - (Magyar Kupa) - 03-04-2019
|-
|rowspan="2"|Most appearances ||  Dénes Dibusz (38 appearances)
|-
|  Marcel Heister (38 appearances)
|-
|rowspan="1"|Top scorer ||  Davide Lanzafame (16 goals)
|-
|Points || 88/126 (69.84%)
|-

Nemzeti Bajnokság I

Matches

League table

Results summary

Results by round

Hungarian Cup

Europa League

References

External links
 Official Website
 UEFA
 fixtures and results

2018-19
Hungarian football clubs 2018–19 season